Uganda first participated at the Olympic Games in 1956, and has sent athletes to compete in every Summer Olympic Games since then, except for the boycotted 1976 Summer Olympics.  Uganda has never competed at the Winter Olympic Games.

Ugandan athletes have won a total of eleven medals, all in athletics and boxing.

The National Olympic Committee for Uganda was created in 1950 and recognized by the International Olympic Committee in 1956.

Medal tables

Medals by Summer Games

Medals by sport

List of medalists

See also
 List of flag bearers for Uganda at the Olympics
 :Category:Olympic competitors for Uganda
 Uganda at the Paralympics

External links
 
 
 

 
Olympics